Mateo Agustín Acosta (born 22 September 1992) is an Argentine professional footballer who plays for Huachipato.

Career
Acosta's career got underway with a 2013–14 spell with Tiro Federal in Torneo Argentino B, where the forward netted thirteen goals in twenty-four matches. Libertad of Torneo Federal A signed him in June 2014, prior to Acosta completing a move to professional football with Juventud Unida on 3 January 2015. His first appearance came against Douglas Haig, with his second match ending with an eighty-ninth minute red card versus Estudiantes. Acosta switched to Guillermo Brown for the 2016 Primera B Nacional, a competition in which he scored in fixtures with Boca Unidos, Los Andes and Gimnasia y Esgrima (J) as they finished in eighth place.

On 7 July 2016, Acosta was signed by Colombia's Alianza Petrolera. He made ten appearances for the Categoría Primera A club, five of which were starts with his final game being an away victory versus Rionegro Águilas on 29 October. In the succeeding February, having terminated his contract in December 2016, Acosta returned to Argentina with Almagro in Primera B Nacional. One goal in thirteen fixtures followed. Guillermo Brown resigned Acosta in August 2017. He bettered his previous season with the club, netting five times across twenty-four matches in 2017–18. July 2018 saw Acosta join Gimnasia y Esgrima on loan.

January 2020 saw Acosta join Deportivo Madryn in Torneo Federal A. His first goal arrived in a win over Deportivo Maipú on 9 February, having made his debut against Atlético Camioneros weeks prior. A move back to the second tier was completed in August as he agreed terms with Brown.

Career statistics
.

References

External links

1992 births
Living people
Footballers from Buenos Aires
Argentine footballers
Association football forwards
Argentine expatriate footballers
Expatriate footballers in Colombia
Argentine expatriate sportspeople in Colombia
Torneo Argentino B players
Torneo Federal A players
Primera Nacional players
Categoría Primera A players
Libertad de Sunchales footballers
Juventud Unida de Gualeguaychú players
Guillermo Brown footballers
Alianza Petrolera players
Club Almagro players
Gimnasia y Esgrima de Mendoza footballers
Deportivo Madryn players
Club Atlético Brown footballers
C.D. Huachipato footballers
Chilean Primera División players
Expatriate footballers in Chile